"Friday on My Mind" is a 1966 song by Australian rock group the Easybeats. Written by band members George Young and Harry Vanda, the track became a worldwide hit, reaching No.16 on the Billboard Hot 100 chart in May 1967 in the US, No.1 on the Dutch Top 40 chart, No.1 in Australia and No.6 in the UK, as well as charting in several other countries. In 2001, it was voted "Best Australian Song" of all time by the Australasian Performing Right Association (APRA) as determined by a panel of 100 music industry personalities. In 2007, "Friday on My Mind" was added to the National Film and Sound Archive's Sounds of Australia registry.

In January 2018, as part of Triple M's "Ozzest 100", the 'most Australian' songs of all time, "Friday on My Mind" was ranked No. 25.

Composition
The minor-key verses of "Friday on My Mind" depict the tedium and drudgery of the work week, taking each day at a time ("Monday morning feels so bad/Coming Tuesday I feel better"). These verses are adorned with a distinctive guitar figure. The build-up to the chorus features a slowly rising vocal, culminating with a shout of "Cos I'll have Friday on my mind!", and launching into a major-key refrain celebrating the pleasures of the weekend in the city.

Though the song has long been termed a "working class anthem", George Young maintained it had "more to do with their outlook on the world than any class statement". According to Harry Vanda, the track's distinctive guitar opening was inspired by a film performance featuring the Swingle Singers: "It went tudutudutudu, which made us all laugh. In the train back from the gig, we were imitating them and suddenly it sounded good. They became the first notes of 'Friday on My Mind'."

Release and aftermath
In addition to its 7" single release in October 1966, the song was issued in the United Kingdom on the band's first album for United Artists titled Good Friday which was also released in North America under the song's title.  In Australia the song was released instead with its B-side, "Made My Bed (Gonna Lie in It)", on the greatest hits package The Best of The Easybeats + Pretty Girl in 1967 and an EP named after the track in September 1967, with the tracks "Sorry", "Who'll Be the One" and "Made My Bed, Gonna Lie in It". A 2005 rerelease on CD single, along with "Remember Sam", "Pretty Girl" and "Made My Bed, Gonna Lie in It", featured a cover (pictured right) based on an earlier French sleeve.

On 28 May 2001, the Australasian Performing Right Association (APRA) celebrated its 75th anniversary by naming the Best Australian Songs of all time, as decided by a 100 strong industry panel, with "Friday on My Mind" being selected as the No.1 song on the list. At the APRA Awards ceremony You Am I performed "Friday on My Mind" with Harry Vanda of The Easybeats guesting on guitar, Ross Wilson of Daddy Cool performed the No. 2 listed song "Eagle Rock", Midnight Oil's "Beds are Burning" at No. 3 was shown on video.

"Friday on My Mind" was ranked No. 10 out of 2006 songs featured in the Triple M Essential 2006 Countdown. In the series 20 to 01, it was No. 1 on the "Greatest Aussie Songs" show. The song is heard in the Australian films One Night Stand (1984), and December Boys (2007).

Charts

Track listing
"Friday on My Mind" (Harry Vanda, George Young) – 2:47
"Made My Bed (Gonna Lie in It)" (Young) – 2:20

Personnel

Musicians
Stevie Wright – lead vocals
Harry Vanda – lead guitar, backing vocals
George Young – rhythm guitar, backing vocals
Dick Diamonde – bass guitar
Gordon "Snowy" Fleet – drums

Technical
Shel Talmy – producer
Glyn Johns – engineer

Cover versions
The song has been covered many times: 
Initially by Tages, who released the song for their November 1966 album Extra Extra.
The Shadows did an instrumental version of the song on their 1967 album Jigsaw.
Les Hou-Lops made a French cover "Vendredi m'obsède" in 1967, also recorded in the same year by Erick Saint Laurent.
The song was also performed by Romanian band Phoenix on their first EP, Vremuri ("Old times") in 1968. 
David Bowie recorded a version on his 1973 RCA covers album Pin Ups; for Harry Vanda, it was "the only cover I ever liked". 
Also in 1973, San Francisco-based Earth Quake covered the song, which was released as the first-ever single on the Beserkley Records label. The live recording by Earth Quake was well known in Cleveland in the late 1970s, as one of three songs played each Friday at 6.00pm by leading rock radio station WMMS to mark the start of the weekend.

Other covers
Other acts who have covered the song include: John Alan Daubert
Chilly
The Dukes (Dutch band)
Gary Moore
Peter Frampton
Peter Doyle
Richard Thompson (1000 Years of Popular Music)
Ben Lee
Blue Öyster Cult
the Busters
the Kursaal Flyers
Tages
The New Orleans based band The Cold 
The punk band London, whose version was recorded by producer Simon Napier-Bell in the same recording studios (IBC Studios in London) where the Easybeats had cut the original. South Yorkshire mod revival band the Gents released Friday on My Mind as a single in 1986 and reached No.95 in the UK national chart with the release.
In July 2014, alternative rock band Residual Kid released a cover of the song as a charity single.

References

External links
Albert Music: The Easybeats
 Listen to a sample of 'Friday on My Mind' and read more about the song on australianscreen online
 'Friday on My Mind' was added to the National Film and Sound Archive of Australia's Sounds of Australia registry in 2007

1966 singles
1967 singles
APRA Award winners
The Easybeats songs
David Bowie songs
Number-one singles in Australia
Parlophone singles
Song recordings produced by Shel Talmy
Songs written by Harry Vanda
Songs written by George Young (rock musician)
United Artists Records singles
1966 songs
Garage rock songs
Protopunk songs
Power pop songs